Oligostomis pardalis is a species of giant casemaker in the family Phryganeidae. It is found in North America.

Subspecies
These two subspecies belong to the species Oligostomis pardalis:
 Oligostomis pardalis pardalis
 Oligostomis pardalis redmani (Betten & Mosely, 1940)

References

Trichoptera
Articles created by Qbugbot
Insects described in 1852